Seltsy is the name of several rural localities in Russia:
Seltsy, Moscow Oblast, a village in Moscow Oblast
Seltsy, Ryazan Oblast, a selo in Ryazan Oblast
Seltsy, Tver Oblast, a selo in Tver Oblast
Seltsy, name of several other rural localities